Sangmélima is a town on the Lobo River, and also the chief town of Lobo division ("Dja et Lobo"), in the South Province ('Province du Sud'), Republic of Cameroon, Africa. The language spoken there is Bulu. French, is also spoken as it is one of the official languages in Cameroon.

People

The population is of the Bulu clan, part of the Beti-Pahuin tribe. The Bulu migrated to the area during the 19th century, having been slave hunters until the British sent elements of the Royal Navy in 1827 to the coastal areas in bid to stop the slave trade. Cameroon's President Paul Biya is a Bulu, from a village near Sangmélima.

Economy
The economy is largely rural, with many chicken farms .

Transport
The National Road 9 passes through the town, and National Road 17 begins there. There is an airstrip near the town.

Ecology
The Dja Faunal Reserve ('Réserve du Biosphère du Dja') is a 5,260 km² reserve that extends to the east of the town, and which was designated a World Heritage Site in 1984. UNESCO calls it: "one of the largest and best-protected rainforests in Africa, with 90% of its area left undisturbed". There are also said to be "vast forested areas" to the south of the town.

See also
Communes of Cameroon

Populated places in South Region (Cameroon)